Jerry, Jerry, Quite Contrary is a 1966 Tom and Jerry short written, produced and directed by Chuck Jones.

Plot
Tom is sleeping, but Jerry, sleepwalking, pulls Tom's whiskers through one side of his face. Annoyed, Tom stops Jerry and turns him around, but Jerry punches Tom's jaw into his face. Tom then snaps his fingers to wake Jerry up, flicks Jerry's head to send it spinning, and hits Jerry with a pool cue, sending Jerry rolling into the wall of his mouse hole. Jerry then pulls Tom's tail into an umbrella, but Tom snaps his fingers again, ties Jerry up in string and unwinds the string to send Jerry spinning into his hole again. Jerry then walks out with a steak knife, but sneezes and wakes up, causing Jerry to feel guilty and return to his hole. Jerry then gulps several cups of coffee to stay awake and prevent himself from attacking Tom, but his eyes open and close themselves three times and he falls asleep. Jerry then walks out with a brick and throws it at Tom, but sneezes and wakes up again. Jerry opens Tom's eyes, and Tom swallows the brick, causing Tom to throw Jerry back into his hole and board it up. Later, Jerry opens the board and with a ball of yarn tied around his waist, ties it around Tom's tail, and spreads it around the house and outside. He finally ties it around an anvil and pushes the anvil down the chimney. Tom is pulled around the house, squeezed through gaps, and pulled up to the chimney, where he hits his head on the anvil. Finally broken, Tom starts crying, packs up, and leaves. Tom walks through a desert, with Jerry sleepwalking behind him.

Production notes
The title is a parody of the nursery rhyme "Mary, Mary, Quite Contrary". Although it was the second short of 1966, Jerry, Jerry, Quite Contrary was among the last completed.

Trivia
This short is banned in the Middle East due to the disturbing thematic issues including Jerry getting revenge on Tom while sleepwalking.

Crew
Co-Director & Layouts: Maurice Noble
Story: Chuck Jones
Animation: Ken Harris, Don Towsley, Tom Ray, Dick Thompson, Ben Washam, & Al Pabian
Backgrounds: Philip DeGuard
Vocal effects: Mel Blanc, William Hanna
Production Manager: Earl Jonas
Music: Dean Elliott
Production Supervised by Les Goldman
Produced & Directed by Chuck Jones

External links

1966 films
1966 short films
1966 animated films
Tom and Jerry short films
Short films directed by Chuck Jones
1960s American animated films
Films scored by Dean Elliott
Animated films without speech
Metro-Goldwyn-Mayer short films
Metro-Goldwyn-Mayer animated short films
Films directed by Maurice Noble
MGM Animation/Visual Arts short films